Eugene Wilson Hodges Farm is a historic home, farm, and national historic district located near Charlotte, Mecklenburg County, North Carolina. The district encompasses four contributing buildings, one contributing site, and five contributing structures in rural Mecklenburg County.  The Eugene Wilson Hodges House was built about 1908, and is a two-story, three-bay I-house with two parallel one-story rear ells.  It has a slate triple-A roof and two exterior, stuccoed-brick chimneys. It features a vernacular Colonial Revival hip roofed wraparound front porch with Doric order columns. Other contributing resources include two chicken coops (c. 1930), a wellhouse (c. 1908), barn (c. 1935), two granaries (c. 1930), two silos (c. 1935), and the agricultural landscape.

It was added to the National Register of Historic Places in 1991.

References

Farms on the National Register of Historic Places in North Carolina
Houses on the National Register of Historic Places in North Carolina
Historic districts on the National Register of Historic Places in North Carolina
Colonial Revival architecture in North Carolina
Houses completed in 1908
Houses in Mecklenburg County, North Carolina
National Register of Historic Places in Mecklenburg County, North Carolina
1908 establishments in North Carolina